Spassky (masculine) or Spasskaya (feminine) is a common Russian surname, usually of descendants of Russian Orthodox clergymen. The neuter form is Spasskoye. The term may refer to:

People
Boris Spassky, Soviet chess player and former world champion
Igor Spassky, Russian scientist, engineer, and entrepreneur

Places
Spassky District, name of several districts in Russia
Spassky (rural locality) (Spasskaya, Spasskoye), name of several rural localities in Russia

Other
Spasskaya Tower, a tower of the Moscow Kremlin